Ælfwald, according to one tradition, reigned as king of Northumbria following the deposition of Eardwulf in 806. This information appears only  in the anonymous tract De primo Saxonum adventu and in the later Flores Historiarum of Roger of Wendover. Roger states that Ælfwald had overthrown Eardwulf.

Ælfwald allegedly reigned for two years before Eardwulf returned, restored to power with the aid of the Emperor Charlemagne and of Pope Leo III. Alternatively, Eardwulf's son Eanred may have succeeded to the throne, rather than Eardwulf.

While only late and exiguous written sources for Ælfwald's reign have survived, modest numbers of coins from his reign exist - minted at York by a moneyer named Cuthheard, who also produced all known coins of Eardwulf's reign.

Lakeland author W. G. Collingwood in a 1917 book, The Likeness of King Elfwald: A Study of Iona and Northumbria, imagined the life of Ælfwald. The work, based on Collingwood's long study of Northumbria which led to his 1919 work Northumbrian Crosses of the pre-Norman Age, was well regarded and has been reprinted.

References
 Kirby, D.P., The Earliest English Kings. London: Unwin Hyman, 1991. 
 
 Yorke, Barbara, Kings and Kingdoms of early Anglo-Saxon England. London: Seaby, 1990.

External links
 
 The Fitzwilliam Museum's Corpus of Early Medieval Coin Finds website

Northumbrian monarchs
8th-century births
9th-century English monarchs
9th-century deaths